Thāron or Tharol is an ancient Meitei literary work (puya), about the lore of the twelve lunar months of a year. It describes the changing pattern of nature in the following months. It is one of the masterpieces of the writers of the ancient times.

The terms, "Tha" means month or moon and "ron", derived from "lon" means knowledge, lore or tradition.

The names of the twelve lunar months were given in Ancient Meitei language in the manuscript. However, the following illustrates both the Ancient Meitei as well as Modern Meitei names, with their Gregorian equivalents:

References 

Pages with unreviewed translations
Puyas